Cornus racemosa, the northern swamp dogwood, gray dogwood, or panicle dogwood, is a shrubby plant native to southeastern Canada and the northeastern United States. It is a member of the dogwood genus Cornus and the family Cornaceae.

Description

It often sends up suckers from underground rhizomes, forming thickets. Its bark is gray and its twigs have white pith. The plant grows upright with a rounded habit, oppositely arranged leaves, and terminally born flowers. After flowering, green fruits (drupes) are produced, and they ripen and turn white from August to October. The flowers and fruit are attached to the plant by bright red pedicels. Many species of birds feed on the fruits. Old branches grow slowly, while new stems are fast growing. In the fall the foliage can take on a reddish or purplish color, though it is not overly showy from a distance.

Classification

Cornus racemosa has been variably treated as a subspecies of Cornus foemina Mill., with which it overlaps.

It occasionally hybridizes with Cornus amomum (silky dogwood), the products of which are named Cornus × arnoldiana.

References

External links 
  Cornus racemosa description with pictures 
 
 Brief description and pictures

racemosa
Flora of Eastern Canada
Flora of the Northeastern United States
Flora of the United States
Trees of the Southeastern United States
Taxa named by Jean-Baptiste Lamarck